The Men's 4 × 200 metre freestyle relay competition of the 2019 African Games was held on 23 August 2019.

Records
Prior to the competition, the existing world and championship records were as follows.

Results

Final
The final was started on 23 August.

References

Men's 4 x 200 metre freestyle relay